Preachin is an album by saxophonist Gene Ammons recorded in 1962 and released on the Prestige label.

Reception
The AllMusic review by Scott Yanow stated: "the great tenor performs 11 religious hymns that are straight from the church... this little-known album is a rather touching and emotional outing, and is quite unique".

Track listing 
All compositions traditional, except as indicated
 "Sweet Hour" - 3:15     
 "Yield Not" - 2:01     
 "Abide with Me" (Henry Francis Lyte, William Henry Monk) - 3:18     
 "Blessed Assurance" (Fanny J. Crosby, Phoebe P. Knapp) - 3:18     
 "The Prayer" - 3:00     
 "You'll Never Walk Alone" (Oscar Hammerstein II, Richard Rodgers) - 3:44     
 "I Believe" (Ervin Drake, Irvin Graham, Jimmy Shirl, Al Stillman) - 3:18     
 "Precious Memories" (J. B. F. Wright) - 4:11     
 "What a Friend" (Joseph M. Scriven, Charles Crozat Converse) - 3:35     
 "Holy Holy" - 2:45     
 "The Light" - 2:49

Personnel 
Gene Ammons - tenor saxophone
Clarence "Sleepy" Anderson - organ 
Sylvester Hickman - bass
Dorral Anderson - drums

References 

Gene Ammons albums
1982 albums
Prestige Records albums